Odorrana banaorum is a species of frog in the family Ranidae that is known from Vietnam and Cambodia.

Its natural habitats are subtropical or tropical moist lowland forests and rivers.
Its status is insufficiently known.

References

banaorum
Amphibians of Vietnam
Amphibians of Cambodia
Frogs of Asia
Amphibians described in 2003
Taxonomy articles created by Polbot